Gangsters Versus Cowboys (Spanish:Gangsters contra charros) is a 1948 Mexican gangster film written, directed by, and starring Juan Orol, and featuring Rosa Carmina and José Pulído. It was made as a sequel to Orol's Gangster's Kingdom. However, it has become a cult film due to its low-budget production values and idiosyncratic style.

Plot

Gangster Johnny Carmenta (Juan Orol), faces Pancho Dominguez El Charro del Arrabal (Jose Pulido), who has imposed his law in the town. The Rumbera Rosa (Rosa Carmina) seduces both men firing their rivalry.

Cast
 Juan Orol as Johnny Carmenta
 Rosa Carmina as Rosa
 José Pulído as Pancho Domínguez El Charro del Arrabal
 Roberto Cañedo as Julio

Legacy
The film has sometimes been compared with the work of American filmmaker Ed Wood, known as "the worst director of all time". However, in contrast to Wood's films, Gangsters Versus Cowboys was successful at the box office. Orol's films were popular, despite their technical deficiencies.

According to the opinion of specialist critics of Mexican cinema, the film ranks as number 68 among the hundred best films of the Mexican cinema.

References

Bibliography
 Daniel Balderston, Mike Gonzalez & Ana M. Lopez. Encyclopedia of Contemporary Latin American and Caribbean Cultures. Routledge, 2002.

External links

 
 Gángsters contra charros in FilmAffinity.com
 Gángsters contra charros in the page of the Mexican Cinema of the ITESM

1948 crime films
1948 films
Mexican black-and-white films
Gangster films
1940s Spanish-language films
Films directed by Juan Orol
Mexican crime films
1940s Mexican films